Spinning Out is an American drama television series, created by Samantha Stratton, that premiered on Netflix on January 1, 2020. In February 2020, the series was canceled after one season.

The series stars Kaya Scodelario as Kat Baker, a young ice skater who suffers a serious injury and is given the opportunity to restart her career as a pairs skater all while hiding her family's history of mental illness. The series follows the Baker family along with Kat's partner Justin Davis and his family.

Premise
Spinning Out follows Kat Baker, an up-and-coming, high-level single skater who is about to turn in her skates after a disastrous fall took her off the competition track. When Kat seizes an opportunity to continue her career as a pair skater with a talented bad-boy partner, she risks exposing a fiercely kept secret that could unravel her entire life. On and off the ice, Kat and her new partner will face daunting odds, injury to body and soul, financial sacrifice, and even potential mental breakdown on their way to realizing their Olympic dream."

Cast and characters

Main

 Kaya Scodelario as Kat Baker, a competitive ice skater secretly struggling with bipolar disorder
 Willow Shields as Serena Baker, Kat's younger half-sister
 Evan Roderick as Justin Davis, a pair skater from a wealthy family who cannot keep a partner and has a bad boy reputation.
 David James Elliott as James Davis, Justin, Reid and Drew’s father
 Sarah Wright Olsen as Mandy Davis, Justin, Reid and Drew’s stepmother and James's second wife
 Svetlana Efremova as Dasha Fedorova, Justin and Kat's coach
 Amanda Zhou as Jenn Yu, Kat's best friend and a fellow figure skater
 Mitchell Edwards as Marcus Holmes, Kat's friend and co-worker
 Kaitlyn Leeb as Leah Starnes, a new skater who was supposed to partner with Justin
 Will Kemp as Mitch Saunders, Serena's coach
 January Jones as Carol Baker, Kat and Serena's mother who also suffers from bipolar disorder and was once a figure skater herself

Recurring
 Jamie Champagne as Drew Davis, Justin’s brother and Reid’s twin
 Jon Champagne as Reid Davis, Justin’s brother and Drew’s twin
 Johnny Weir as Gabriel Richardson, Leah's pairs partner
 Zahra Bentham as Alana
 Morgan Kelly as Reggie, Serena's father
 Oscar Hsu as Peter Yu, Jenn's father
 Will Bowes as Brent Fisher, Marcus's friend
 Charlie Hewson as Dr. Parker
 Eli Brown as Dave, Kat’s ex boyfriend in the beginning

Episodes

Production

Development
On October 11, 2018, it was announced that Netflix had given the production a series order consisting of ten episodes. The series was created by Samantha Stratton who was also expected to serve as co-showrunner with Lara Olsen. Stratton and Olsen were also set to executive produce the series alongside Joby Harold and Tory Tunnell with Matt Schwartz serving as a co-executive producer. Production companies were slated to consist of Safehouse Pictures. On February 3, 2020, it was reported that the series was canceled after one season.

Casting
Alongside the series order announcement, it was confirmed that Emma Roberts would star in the series. On October 31, 2018, it was reported that Roberts had dropped out of the series, citing a scheduling conflict. In December 2018, it was announced that Kaya Scodelario had been cast to replace Roberts in the role of Kat Baker. It was also reported that Willow Shields, Evan Roderick, Johnny Weir, Sarah Wright Olsen, Will Kemp, Kaitlyn Leeb, Amanda Zhou, and Mitchell Edwards had been cast in series regular roles. On January 16, 2019, it was reported that January Jones had joined the cast in a leading role. On February 21, 2019, it was announced that Svetlana Efremova and Charlie Hewson had been cast in a series regular role and recurring capacity respectively.

Figure skating doubles
A number of Canadian figure skaters served as skating doubles for the series' stars, including Michelle Long (singles skating) and Elizabeth Putnam (singles and pairs skating) for Kaya Scodelario as Kat Baker, Kim Deguise Léveillée (jumps) for Scodelario and Willow Shields as Serena Baker, and Dylan Moscovitch for Evan Roderick as Justin Davis. Canadian pair team Evelyn Walsh and Trennt Michaud served as doubles for Kat and Justin's pair elements. Other doubles include Lilika Zheng for Amanda Zhou as Jenn Yu, Emma Cullen for January Jones as Carol Baker, and Madeline Schizas for Kaitlyn Leeb as Leah Starnes.

Filming
Principal photography for the series took place from January 28 to May 16, 2019 in Toronto, Ontario.

Reception

On review aggregation website Rotten Tomatoes, the series has an approval rating of 63% with an average rating of 6.5/10, based on 16 reviews. The website's critical consensus states, "Though at times more melodramatic than meaningful, Spinning Out campy, guilty-pleasure exterior hides a surprisingly thoughtful exploration of living with a mental illness." On Metacritic, it has a weighted average score of 47 out of 100, based 4 critics, indicating "mixed or average reviews".

Robyn Bahr of The Hollywood Reporter called it "Uneven but mostly engrossing, it combines the unflinching class struggles of I, Tonya, the star-crossed romance of The Cutting Edge and the disability-as-tragedy goopiness of Ice Castles." Caroline Framke of Variety wrote "The series has all the right ingredients for an addictive watch: a solid premise, some compelling actors, and some classic teen show tensions and rhythms in the earnest vein of 'Degrassi' braiding it all together. But as the season plods towards its uneven finale, 'Spinning Out' instead does exactly what its title promises instead of sticking the landing."

References

External links
 
 

2020 American television series debuts
2020 American television series endings
2020s American drama television series
Bipolar disorder in fiction
Figure skating on television
English-language Netflix original programming
Television shows filmed in Toronto
Television shows set in Idaho